Jozef Béreš jun. (born 4 October 1984) is a Slovak rally driver. He used to race in the JWRC in the 2006 and 2007 season. He became Slovak Rally Champion five times 2005, 2008, 2009, 2010, 2011.

WRC results

JWRC results

References

External links 
 eWRC-results.com profile

1984 births
Living people
Slovak racing drivers
World Rally Championship drivers